Galyna Kuznetsova  (born ) is a Ukrainian Paralympic sitting volleyball player.

She is part of the Ukraine women's national sitting volleyball team. 
She competed at the 2004 Summer Paralympics.
She competed at the 2012 Summer Paralympics winning the bronze medal, after beating the Netherlands in the bronze medal match.

See also
 Ukraine at the 2012 Summer Paralympics

References

External links
Ukraine beats Great Britain women's sitting volleyball in straight sets at 2012 Summer Paralympics

1960 births
Living people
Volleyball players at the 2012 Summer Paralympics
Paralympic volleyball players of Ukraine
Ukrainian sitting volleyball players
Women's sitting volleyball players
Medalists at the 2012 Summer Paralympics
Paralympic medalists in volleyball
Paralympic bronze medalists for Ukraine